Rossini is an Italian surname. Notable people with the surname include:

Andrea Rossini (born 1990), Italian footballer (goalkeeper)
Carolina Rossini, Brazilian-American attorney
Carl Rossini Diton (1886–1962), American pianist and composer
Carlo Conti Rossini (1872–1949), Italian orientalist
Elena Rossini, Italian filmmaker, writer and artist
Fausto Rossini (born 1978), Italian footballer (forward)
Gioachino Rossini (1792–1868), Italian composer
Giuseppe Rossini (born 1986), Italian-Belgian footballer
Jonathan Rossini, Swiss footballer
Luigi Rossini (1790–1857), Italian artist
Márcio Rossini (born 1960), Brazilian former footballer
Salvatore Rossini (born 1986), Italian volleyball player
Stefano Rossini (born 1971), Italian footballer
Stefano Rossini (footballer, born 1991), Italian
Stéphane Rossini (born 1963), Swiss politician

See also
Rossi (surname)
Rossini (disambiguation)

Italian-language surnames